Magnifica 70 is a 2015 Brazilian television drama aired on HBO Brasil, that ran for three series from 2015 to 2018.

Set in 1970s Brazil, "a staid erotica censor falls in love with a film star, who reminds him of an obsessive love from the past"; that love was his wife's sister, who had a mind twisted by her father.

Cast
Marcos Winter as Vicente
Simone Spoladore as Dora Dumar
Adriano Garib as Manolo
Maria Luísa Mendonça as Isabel Souto
Paulo César Peréio as General Souto
Leandro Firmino as Carioca
Stepan Nercessian as Larsen
Joana Fomm as Lúcia Souto
Vinícius de Oliveira as Saulo
Cristina Lago as Bianca
Maria Zilda Bethlem as Madre
Mariana Lima as Marina
Tammy Di Calafiori as Melissa
Pietro Mário as Chefe da Cooperativa
Milhem Cortaz as Major Chagas
Rogério Fróes as Seu Lorenço
Bella Camero as Ângela Souto
Carlo Mossy as Lúcifer Santos
Pierre Baitelli as Dario
Charles Fricks as Wolf

Reception

Awards and nominations

International Emmy Award

References

External links
 

2010s Brazilian television series
2015 Brazilian television series debuts
Portuguese-language television shows
Portuguese-language HBO original programming
Brazilian drama television series
Television series set in the 1970s